Arapaj is a village in the former municipality of Rrashbull,  Durrës County, Albania.

At the 2015 local government reform it became part of the municipality Durrës. It is a southern suburb of Durrës, located near the Mediterranean coast, approximately 6 kilometres south of this city.

Arapaj is a noted archaeological site, containing the substantial Basilica of Saint Michael dedicated to Saint Michael, an early Palaeo-Christian church which is believed to back to the fifth or sixth century.  It has been declared a Cultural Monument of Albania because of its architectural significance.  A mosaic unearthed in the Basilica also demonstrates how engrained its culture was later on with the early Byzantine Empire.

References

External links

Maplandia World Gazetteer

Populated places in Durrës
Archaeological sites in Albania
Villages in Durrës County